El Borj Mosque  or Mosque of the tower, also known as Sidi Yahia Mosque is a Tunisian mosque in the northern suburb of the Medina of Tunis.

Localization
It is located in 1 Hedi Saidi Street near Bab Laassal, one the Medina of Tunis's gates.

Etymology
The mosque got its name from a tour that is near to it and has the name of the saint Sidi Yahia El Slimani El Yamani.

History
According to the commemorative plaque at the entrance, it was built with a madrasa during the Hafsid era in the 14th century.
It was restored between 1973 and 1974.

References 

Mosques in Tunis
14th-century mosques